The surname Courvoisier or de Courvoisier is in origin a French word, meaning 'shoemaker'. The word comes from Old French courveis ('leather') which itself comes from the Latin word Cordubense meaning 'from Cordova', originally referring to a kind of leather associated with that city.

The name may refer to:
Ludwig Georg Courvoisier (1843–1918), a Swiss surgeon
Fritz Courvoisier, Swiss watchmaker, military and political figure
Leopold Courvoisier, Swiss astronomer
Jean Joseph Antoine de Courvoisier, French magistrate and politician
René Courvoisier, Swiss field hockey player
François Benjamin Courvoisier (d.1840), valet and murderer of Lord William Russell (1767–1840)
Sylvie Courvoisier, Swiss composer and musician

References

French-language surnames
Occupational surnames